A triose is a monosaccharide, or simple sugar, containing three carbon atoms. There are only three possible trioses (including dihydroxyacetone): L-glyceraldehyde and D-glyceraldehyde, the two enantiomers of glyceraldehyde, which are aldotrioses because the carbonyl group is at the end of the chain, and dihydroxyacetone, the only ketotriose, which is symmetrical and therefore has no enantiomers.    

Trioses are important in cellular respiration. During glycolysis, fructose-1,6-bisphosphate is broken down into glyceraldehyde-3-phosphate and dihydroxyacetone phosphate. Lactic acid and pyruvic acid are later derived from these molecules.

References

Trioses